Berford Lake is a lake in South Bruce Peninsula, Bruce County in southwestern Ontario, Canada.

The lake has several unnamed inflows at the east, southeast, and south. The primary outflow is the Rankin River, which flows via the Sauble River to Lake Huron.

See also
List of lakes in Ontario

References

External links

Lakes of Bruce County